"Maybe Tomorrow" is a hit single recorded by American soul family quintet the Jackson 5, in 1971. "Maybe Tomorrow" was included on the Jackson 5's album of the same title, and was also featured on Goin' Back to Indiana. 
The song was released again in 2009 via a Carl Sturken and Evan Rogers' remix, with an orchestral arrangement by Rob Mounsey, from a compilation album The Remix Suite.

The song peaked at number 3 on the Billboard Hot R&B Singles chart, and at number 20 on the Billboard Hot 100.

Cash Box said of it that the "group's delightful harmonies and a teasing rhythm section put a sparkling gloss into" the song.

Personnel
Lead vocals by Michael Jackson
Background vocals by Jermaine Jackson, Marlon Jackson, Jackie Jackson, Tito Jackson
Instruments by Los Angeles musicians

Charts

UB40 version
English reggae band UB40 recorded a reggae-style cover version of the song in 1987. This was released as a single, peaking at #14 in the UK Singles Chart, and appeared on their compilation album The Best of UB40 – Volume One, released the same year.

Samples
The Jackson 5 recording was later sampled by rapper Ghostface Killah on his 1996 song "All That I Got Is You".

References

External links

1971 singles
The Jackson 5 songs
Songs written by Berry Gordy
Songs written by Freddie Perren
Songs written by Deke Richards
1971 songs
Songs written by Alphonzo Mizell
Motown singles